Refuge de La Martin is a refuge in the Alps, near Tignes and Val d'Isère mountain-ski resorts.

http://www.refugelamartin.fr

Mountain huts in the Alps
Mountain huts in France